Paul Borofsky (November 11, 1901 – October 2, 1965) was a Russian-born American film editor.

Selected filmography
 Dangerous Mists (1944)
 Sailor's Holiday (1944)
 The Missing Juror (1944)
 Gunning for Vengeance (1946)
 Lone Star Moonlight (1946)
 The Lone Hand Texan (1947)
 West of Dodge City (1947)
 Phantom Valley (1948)
 Challenge of the Range (1949)
 The Blazing Trail (1949)
 Laramie (1949)
 Trail of the Rustlers (1950)
 Lightning Guns  (1950)
 The Kid from Amarillo (1951)
 Ridin' the Outlaw Trail (1951)
Bonanza Town (1951)
 Pecos River (1951)
 Smoky Canyon (1952)
 Junction City (1952)
Laramie Mountains (1952)
 The Rough, Tough West (1952)

References

Bibliography
 Pitts, Michael R. Western Film Series of the Sound Era. McFarland, 2009.

External links

1901 births
1965 deaths
American film editors
Russian film editors
Emigrants from the Russian Empire to the United States